Anna is an urban locality (urban-type settlement) and the administrative center of Anninsky District of Voronezh Oblast, Russia. Population:

References

Notes

Sources

Urban-type settlements in Voronezh Oblast